Events in the year 1823 in Norway.

Incumbents
Monarch: Charles III John

Events

 King Carl III (Karl Johan) ordered to build the royal palace in Christiania.

Arts and literature
 Det Dramatiske Selskab in Stavanger was founded.

Births

6 January – Aimar August Sørenssen, politician and Minister (d.1908)
14 April – Christian Jensen, politician and Minister (d.1884)
7 June – Jørgen Breder Faye, banker and politician (d.1908)
20 July – Jacob Dybwad, bookseller and publisher (d. 1899).
8 October – Sivert Andreas Nielsen, politician (d.1904)
26 November – Thomas Tellefsen, pianist and composer (d.1874)
21 December  – Asbjørn Kloster, social reformer and leader of the Norwegian temperance movement. (d. 1876 in Norway)

Full date unknown
Lars Christian Dahll, politician and Minister (d.1908)
Simon Pedersen Holmesland, politician (d.1895)
 Sofie Parelius, actress (died 1902)

Deaths
16 December - Hans Carl Knudtzon, merchant, ship-owner and politician (b. 1751)

See also

References